Miracle of Flight is a 1974 British animated short comedy film written and directed by Terry Gilliam.

Synopsis
Ever since Man first observed the smooth, graceful soaring of a Boeing 707, he has had an unquenchable desire to fly. 

After a short montage of various birds (and a Boeing 707) in flight, we see several attempts of people attempting to fly themselves. A shepherd attempts flying by flapping his wings, only to land on top of his sheep. Another man constructs a suit shaped like a bird to fly, only to crash upon leaping off a cliff.

Early Attempts

One man dons bird talon shoes and meets the same fate as the first man. Two more try and also fall off the cliff (one has himself covered in tar and bird feathers, and another flattens his arms, so he can merely glide).

A "certain king" in a "certain country" gathers his scientists to try and break the flight barrier, but all the king does is kick the scientists off a high cliff all the while loudly commanding "FLY!". On 27 July 1643, it initially appears that one scientist was successful in being able to fly, but he ends up hitting the ground (the camera was merely turned on its side as he was falling to appear as though he were flying and rotates back to normal after the scientist's impact). "Nope, that's still not right", the king comments. "Next."

Assisted Flight

A man uses seagulls to lift him up into the air. From below, people watch in astonishment, while one elderly woman throws bread crumbs on the pavement, muttering, "Nice little birdies." This ends the man's flight, as the gulls dive bomb to the ground.

Three hundred years later, a man living in Krakatau, East of Miami, invents the airline ticket. Other people invent various items essential to air travel, such as stewardesses, in-flight movies, and the air terminal.

The last scene depicts a man goes through the airport check-in, handing his boarding pass to a stewardess, and heads off on his flight...which is getting kicked off the same high cliff where the king kicked off all his scientists several years ago. The short ends with the line "Nope. Still not got it."

References

External links
 
 
The Miracle of Flight on Letterboxd

1974 comedy films
1974 short films
1974 films
British animated short films
British aviation films
1970s animated short films
Short films directed by Terry Gilliam
Cutout animation films
Films set in the 17th century
Films set in 1943
Films with screenplays by Terry Gilliam
British comedy short films
1970s English-language films
1970s British films